William Clement (1707 – 15 January 1782) was an Irish academic who spent his whole career at Trinity College Dublin (TCD), teaching botany, natural philosophy, mathematics and medicine there.  He was the third Erasmus Smith's Professor of Natural and Experimental Philosophy at TCD (1745-1759).

Life and career
William Clement was born in Carrickmacross, Monaghan, son of merchant Thomas Clement. He matriculated at TCD on 28 April 1722 at the age of 14.  He was a Scholar in 1724 and received BA (1726), MA (1731). He was elected a Fellow in 1733, and later took medical degrees MB (1747), MD (1748).  He was appointed Lecturer in Botany (1733), Erasmus Smith's Professor of Natural and Experimental Philosophy (1745–1759), Donegall Lecturer in Mathematics (1750–1759), and Regius Professor of Physic (1761–1781). He also served as Vice-Provost. Clement was MP for Dublin University from 1761 to 1768; and then for Dublin City until 1776.

References

External links
 Burtchaell, G. D., and Sadleir, T. U. (eds), Alumni Dublinensis: A Register of the Students, Graduates, Professors and Provosts of Trinity College in the University of Dublin, 1593–1860 (Dublin, 1935), p. 156

Academics of Trinity College Dublin
Alumni of Trinity College Dublin
Fellows of Trinity College Dublin
Scholars of Trinity College Dublin
Donegall Lecturers of Mathematics at Trinity College Dublin
18th-century Irish botanists
18th-century Irish mathematicians
People from Carrickmacross
1707 births
1782 deaths
Irish MPs 1761–1768
Irish MPs 1769–1776
Members of the Parliament of Ireland (pre-1801) for County Dublin constituencies